Radomyr Ruslanovich Stelmakh (born 18 August 2005) is a Ukrainian artistic gymnast. He’s a Junior European team and Euro Youth Olympic Festival individual all-around gold medalist.

Career
Stelmakh took up gymnastics at six years old. He is a pupil of Zaporizhzhia children's and Youth Sports School No. 1.

2020 
Stelmakh competed at the  2020 European Championships held in Mersin, Turkey. While there he helped the Ukrainian junior team win gold. Individually he also made the pommel horse final, where he took sixth place.

2022 
Stelmakh competed at the Euro Youth Olympic Festival, where he won the individual All-Around. Additionally he won the bronze in the mixed pair event together with Anna Lashchevska. He also won silver on floor and pommel horse and a bronze medal on parallel bars.

Competitive history

References

External links 

 

2005 births
Living people
Ukrainian male artistic gymnasts
21st-century Ukrainian people